You & Me is the fifth studio album by American blues rock musician Joe Bonamassa. Produced by Kevin Shirley, it was released on June 6, 2006 by J&R Adventures and topped the US Billboard Top Blues Albums chart. It is Bonamassa's first album not to contain a title track.

Reception

Music website Allmusic gave You & Me 3.5 out of five stars, with reviewer Hal Horowitz calling the album "a solid blues-rock release and arguably his best work to date", but also an album "that doesn't take the chances that he claims might push the guitarist into uncharted territory". Music magazine Prefix published their review with a rating of four out of ten, criticising the indulgence of the style of music displayed on the album as displayed in the many guitar solos.

Track listing

Chart performance

Personnel

Primary musical performers
Joe Bonamassa – guitars, vocals
Carmine Rojas – bass
Jason Bonham – drums
Rick Melick – piano, organ, tambourine
Jeff Bova – orchestration, programming

Additional musicians
Pat Thrall – additional guitar on "Bridge to Better Days"
Doug Henthorn – vocals on "Tea for One"
LD Miller – harmonica on "Your Funeral and My Trial"

Additional personnel
Kevin Shirley – production, mixing
Mark Gray – engineering
Justin Pintar – engineering assistance
Luis Tovar – engineering assistance
Leon Zervos – mastering

References

2006 albums
Joe Bonamassa albums
Albums produced by Kevin Shirley